The Water Garden by Lawrence Halprin is located on the Washington State Capitol campus in Olympia, Washington, United States. The interactive water feature was installed in 1972.

References

1972 establishments in Washington (state)
Washington State Capitol campus
Water gardens
Outdoor sculptures in Olympia, Washington